Code page 850 (CCSID 850) (also known as CP 850, IBM 00850, OEM 850, DOS Latin 1) is a code page used under DOS and Psion's EPOC16 operating systems in Western Europe. Depending on the country setting and system configuration, code page 850 is the primary code page and default OEM code page in many countries, including various English-speaking locales (e.g. in the United Kingdom, Ireland, and Canada), whilst other English-speaking locales (like the United States) default to use the hardware code page 437.

Code page 850 differs from code page 437 in that many of the box-drawing characters, Greek letters, and various symbols were replaced with additional Latin letters with diacritics, thus greatly improving support for Western European languages (all characters from ISO 8859-1 are included). At the same time, the changes frequently caused display glitches with programs that made use of the box-drawing characters to display a GUI-like surface in text mode.

In 1998, code page 858 was derived from this code page by changing code point 213 (D5hex) from a dotless i ‹ı› to the euro sign ‹€›. Despite this, IBM's PC DOS 2000, released in 1998, changed their definition of code page 850 to what they called modified code page 850 now including the euro sign at code point 213 instead of adding support for the new code page 858.

Systems largely replaced code page 850 with Windows-1252 which contains all same letters, and later with Unicode.

Character set
Each character appears with its equivalent Unicode code-point. Only the second half of the table (code points 128–255) is shown, the first half (code points 0–127) being the same as code page 437.

See also
 Western Latin character sets (computing)
 Hardware code page
 LMBCS-1

Notes

References

850